Fencing competitions at the 2023 Pan American Games in Santiago, Chile are scheduled to be held between October 30 and November 4, 2023. The fencing events will be held at the Paralympic Training Center, located in the National Stadium Park cluster in Santiago.

12 medal events are scheduled to be contested, in the three disciplines of épée, foil and sabre. In each discipline an individual and team event will be held for each gender. A total of 162 fencers qualified to compete at the games.

Qualification

A total of 162 fencers will qualify to compete. Each nation may enter a maximum of 18 athletes (nine per gender), unless they qualified an athlete via the Cali 2021 Junior Pan American Games. The gold medalists in the individual events of Cali 2021 received a nominal place for the Santiago 2023 Pan American Games. If the athletes who qualified at the Cali 2021 Junior Pan American Games do not participate in the Santiago 2023 Pan American Games, said place will be forfeited and cannot be transferred to another NOC or athlete. The top seven teams at the 2022 Pan American Championships, along with the top two individuals not qualified through the team event will qualify for each respective discipline per gender. The host nation, Chile, automatically qualifies the maximum number of fencers (18). A maximum of two athletes from one NOC can enter the individual events. Only the winning countries in Cali will have the advantage of competing with 3 fencers in the individual
event in case of having qualified for Santiago 2023 with the team of their respective weapon.

Participating nations
A total of 15 countries qualified athletes.

Medal summary

Medalists
Men's events

Women's events

See also
Fencing at the 2024 Summer Olympics

References

 
Events at the 2023 Pan American Games
Pan American Games
2023